Waveriders is a 2008 documentary film produced by Margo Harkin and directed by Joel Conroy.

Synopsis 
Waveriders focuses on the Irish roots of surfing. The film covers the life of Irish-Hawaiian surfer George Freeth and his influence in popularizing surfing in California and his contributions to lifeguarding.
It also follows Irish, British and American surfers Richie Fitzgerald, Gabe Davies, Kelly Slater and the Malloy Brothers. The surfers conquer enormous sixty foot waves - the biggest swell to have been ridden off the Irish Atlantic Coast.

Irish surfer Easkey Britton is also featured in the film and was the first female surfer to ride the "big wave", Aill na Searrach off the Cliffs of Moher in 2007.

Production
Director Joel Conroy began planning the film in 2005 when he read about George Freeth in a newspaper. He researched Freeth's background, tracking down his friends and relatives. 
The film was in development for 3 years; filming was over 2 years. It was shot on 35mm film to give it a vintage feel.

Reception

Critical response 
Rotten Tomatoes gives the film a score of 56% based on reviews from 16 critics.

Awards 
 
Waveriders won the 2008 Audience Choice Award from the Jameson Dublin International Film Festival, the 2009 Irish Film and Television Awards inaugural George Morrison Feature Documentary Award and the Best Documentary Award at the 2009 SURFER Poll & Video Awards.

Margo Harkin (Producer) and Joel Conroy (Director) were awarded Outstanding Achievement in film making for Waveriders at the 2009 Newport Beach Film Festival.

See also 
 Surfing in Ireland
 Surf film
 Cinema of Ireland

References

External links
 Waveriders official website
 
 
 Waveriders at All Movie Guide
 
 George Freeth The world's first professional surfer

2008 films
Irish documentary films
Documentary films about surfing
English-language Irish films
2008 documentary films
2000s English-language films
English-language documentary films